David Kass (born June 16, 1970) is an American former professional tennis player.

Biography
Born in 1970, Kass grew up in Bexley, a suburb of Columbus, Ohio. Kass, who won junior titles at both the Orange Bowl and Easter Bowl, represented the United States at the 1986 World Youth Cup (now the Junior Davis Cup), as a teammate of Michael Chang and Jim Courier.

Kass played college tennis at the University of Michigan, where he was a three-time All-American and was the 1992 Big Ten Player of the Year.

A right-handed player, Kass toured professionally from 1992 to 1993, reaching a career high singles ranking of 288 in the world. He was runner-up at an ATP Challenger event in Halifax in 1992, then in 1993 featured in the qualifying draws of three of the four grand slam tournaments.

From his home town of Columbus he now runs the Kass Tennis Academy. He is the current coach of Katrina Scott.

References

External links
 
 

1970 births
Living people
American male tennis players
Michigan Wolverines men's tennis players
Tennis people from Ohio
Sportspeople from Columbus, Ohio
People from Bexley, Ohio
American tennis coaches